Michael Phillips (born June 29, 1943) is an American film producer.

Early life and education
Phillips was born in Brooklyn and raised on Long Island. His mother, Shirley, was a schoolteacher and housewife; his father, Larry, was a garment manufacturer. They later became dealers in ancient Asian art. Phillips received a B.A. in history from Dartmouth College and a Juris Doctor from New York University School of Law. After being admitted to the New York Bar in 1969, he worked as a securities analyst on Wall Street. In 1971, he and his wife moved to Malibu, California and produced their first film, Steelyard Blues, starring Jane Fonda and Donald Sutherland.

Film career
In 1972, Phillips along with his then-wife, Julia Phillips, and producer Tony Bill financed the development of the screenplay, The Sting for $3,500 in total. In 1973, the film received the Academy Award for Best Picture. Michael and Julia were the first husband-and-wife team to win the Best Picture award. The couple then produced Taxi Driver (which would go on to win the Palme D'Or at the 1976 Cannes Film Festival) and Steven Spielberg's Close Encounters of the Third Kind.

In 1984, his production company, Mercury Entertainment, went public with the intention to capitalize on his prior successes. Mercury planned to produce three to five films a year in the $10-million range with operating and development costs to be paid by ABC Motion Pictures while production financing was provided by the major studios. The 1984 film The Flamingo Kid and the 1991 film Don't Tell Mom the Babysitter's Dead were not as successful as hoped and in 1992, Philips offered to take the company private repurchasing outstanding stock at seven cents on the dollar. In 1986, he teamed up with Michael Douglas to launch a new company to produce independently financed features, and has option to buy Douglas' company Big Stick Inc. In 2006, Mercury Entertainment was merged with Debmar Studios to form Debmar-Mercury (now a wholly owned subsidiary of Lions Gate Entertainment).

The Sting was inducted into the Producers Guild of America's Hall of Fame, granting each of its producers a Golden Laurel Award. In June 2007, Taxi Driver was ranked as the 52nd-best American feature film of all time by the American Film Institute. In December 2007, Close Encounters was deemed "culturally, historically, or aesthetically significant" by the Library of Congress and selected for preservation in the National Film Registry.

Select filmography
He was a producer in all films unless otherwise noted.

Film

As an actor

Thanks

Television

Thanks

Personal life
Phillips is a Trustee Professor at Dodge College of Film and Media Arts, where he taught for several years.

He has been married to writer Juliana Maio since 1987 and has three daughters, Kate, Amanda, and Natasha.

References

External links

1943 births
Film producers from New York (state)
Living people
People from Brooklyn
Dartmouth College alumni
New York University School of Law alumni
Producers who won the Best Picture Academy Award
People from Long Island